Edgar Eckert (born 13 January 1948) is a German cross-country skier. He competed in the men's 30 kilometre event at the 1972 Winter Olympics.

References

1948 births
Living people
German male cross-country skiers
Olympic cross-country skiers of West Germany
Cross-country skiers at the 1972 Winter Olympics
People from Neubau
20th-century German people